Johan Blanch (modern Catalan spelling: Joan Blanc) was an Occitan troubadour who composed a canso for a joc floral at the Consistori del Gay Saber. According to the rubric of the fourteenth-century chansonnier that preserves it, he was a Catalan whose poem "won the violet" (gazaynet la violeta), top prize. His canso is elegant and pleading.

His dates are entirely unknown, as is the year he won the violet, though  hypothesised 1360.

References
Jeanroy, Alfred (1940). "Poésies provençales inédites du XIVe siècle d'après le manuscrit de Barcelone". Annales du Midi, 52:241–279.
Riquer i Morera, Martí de (1964). Història de la Literatura Catalana, vol. 1. Barcelona: Edicions Ariel.

External links
Ben hay razo quez yeu mos xans espanda, ed. by Jeanroy
Johan Blanch, catala, gazaynet la violeta per aquesta canso. «Ben hay razo quez ieu mos xans espanda». Folio 121v from the Cançoner Gil showing the canso with which Blanch won the violet at Toulouse. Presented by the Biblioteca Virtual Miguel de Cervantes.

Poets from Catalonia
Spanish troubadours
Year of death unknown
Year of birth unknown